Hoary rock-rose is a common name for several plants and may refer to:

Cistus × incanus
Cistus creticus
Helianthemum canum
Helianthemum oelandicum